Ambassa is a census town located in the Indian state of Tripura a Municipal Council in Dhalai district. Ambassa is also the headquarters of the Dhalai district.

Demographics
 India census, Ambassa had a population of 6,052. Males constituted 54% of the population and females 46%. Ambassa had an average literacy rate of 70%, higher than the national average of 59.5%; 60% of males and 40% of females were literate. 13% of the population were under 6 years of age.

See also
 List of cities and towns in Tripura

References

Cities and towns in Dhalai district
Dhalai district